Ahatlı is a village in the District of Kaş, Antalya Province, Turkey.  It is 175 km distant from Antalya
city center and 15 km to Kaş, both important centers of tourism in Turkey.

References

Villages in Kaş District